You Were There may refer to:

Music 
 "You Were There" (1989), an unreleased song by Michael Jackson and Buz Kohan
 "You Were There" (Southern Sons song), by Southern Sons from the 1992 album Nothing But the Truth
 "You Were There", by Babyface from the 1998 album Christmas with Babyface
 "You Were There", by Avalon, from the 2004 album The Creed
 "You Were There", a duet between Ray Charles and Gladys Knight, from the 2005 album Genius & Friends

Books 
 "You Were There", a novel by Thelma Strabel

See also 
 "Five Candles (You Were There)", a song by Jars of Clay from the 1997 album Much Afraid
 "ICO -You Were There-", from the soundtrack of the 2001 PlayStation 2 video game ICO